Justice Fish may refer to:

Frank L. Fish (1863–1927), associate justice of the Vermont Supreme Court
William H. Fish (1849–1926), associate justice and chief justice of the Supreme Court of Georgia